Risbury is a village in the civil parish of Humber in Herefordshire, England, and  south-east of Leominster.

There used to be a Methodist chapel, a post office and The Hop Pole public house in the village, but all three are now residential dwellings. At Risbury cross there is a bus shelter, however the accompanying red phone box was decommissioned in 2018 and moved to the village hall opposite to house a defibrillator.

Risbury Camp, an Iron Age hill fort, is just outside the village on private farmland, although a public footpath runs nearby. There is a green burial ground, Humber Woodland of Remembrance, outside within the parish.

References

External links

Humber Woodland of Remembrance
Risbury Camp hill fort

Villages in Herefordshire